A simile is a figure of speech making an explicit comparison.

Simile or Similes may also refer to:

 A term in music,
 Similes (album), by Matthew Cooper
 Simile (computer virus), a Windows virus,
 SIMILE (Semantic Interoperability of Metadata and Information in unLike Environments), a project to develop semantic web tools

See also
 Bulbophyllum simile, an orchid
 Caenocara simile, a puffball beetle
 Lucifuga simile, a Cuban fish
 Trillium simile, a Jeweled wakerobin
 Zygophyllum simile, an Australian herb
 Facsimile
 Similarity (disambiguation)
 Semele (disambiguation)
 Smile (disambiguation)